Chicago Norske Klub (1911 to 1971) was a Chicago, Illinois based Norwegian-American cultural and social organization.

Background
Chicago Norske Klub was founded in 1911 through the merger of two prior organizations which had dated to 1890, the Norwegian Club in Chicago (Den Norske Klub i Chicago) and the Norwegian Quartet Club (Den Norske Kvartet Klub). 

Its membership consisted largely of businessmen  and professionals including a number of graduates of Norwegian technical schools. Programs were aimed at sociability and fellowship. The Chicago Norske Klub established premises near Logan Square on Kedzie Avenue through financing arranged by the State Bank of Chicago and through the initiative of Birger Osland, a Chicago investment banker.

Operations
Emil Biorn was the instructor and leader of a chorus and an orchestra for a number of years. The Dramatic Society was founded in 1919. In 1920, an annual art exhibit was started.  The club was noted for its collection of fine art principally by Norwegian-American artists. Among others, featured artists included  Sigvald Asbjørnsen, Benjamin Blessum, Carl L. Boeckmann, Lars Fletre, Alexander Grinager,  Arvid Nyholm, Bror Julius Olsson Nordfeldt, Karl Ouren and Svend Rasmussen Svendsen.

The Chicago Norske Klub was also the site of a convention sponsored by the Norwegian-American Technical Society of Chicago. The club ended operation and sold its building to a lodge of the Sons of Norway in 1971.

Guest speakers
The club featured a number of notable guest speakers during the course of its existence. 
General Leonard Wood
Jane Addams
Queen Marie of Romania
Crown Prince Olav and Crown Princess Martha of Norway
Fridtjof Nansen
Roald Amundsen
Carl J. Hambro
Johan Bojer
Ole Rolvaag

Sources
The best sources of information about the Chicago Norske Klub are two booklets, one published on the occasion of the dedication of its new club house in 1917, the other in 1930 in observance of the organization's fortieth anniversary: Chicago Norske Klub, Historical Sketch (Chicago: 1917) and Chicago Norske Klub, 1890-1930 (Chicago, 1930).

Other sources
 Haugan, Reidar Rye. Prominent Artists and Exhibits of Their Work in Chicago (Chicago Norske Klub. Nordmanns-Forbundet, 24: 371-374, Volume 7, 1933)
Heitmann, Helen M. From Fjord to Prairie: Norwegian-Americans in the Midwest, 1825-1975. Chicago, IL: Norwegian-American Immigration Anniversary Commission, 1976
 Strand, A. E. A History of the Norwegians in Illinois. Chicago, IL: John Anderson Publishing Co., 1905

Footnotes

External links
Chicago Norske Klub exterior
Chicago Norske Klub interior

Clubs and societies in the United States
Organizations based in Chicago
Civic and political organizations of the United States
1911 establishments in Illinois
Norwegian-American culture in Chicago
1971 disestablishments in Illinois
Organizations established in 1911
Organizations disestablished in 1971